Auguste Toussaint (1911–1987) was the Archivist in Chief of Mauritius and an historian of his island, Mascarene Islands and Indian Ocean.

Bibliography
In French
 1992 - L'océan Indien au XVIIIe, éd. Flammarion, 
 1980 - Histoire de l'océan Indien, collection Que sais-je?, éd. PUF
 1979 - Les Frères Surcouf, éd. Flammarion, Paris
 1978 - Histoire des corsaires, collection Que sais-je ?, éd. PUF
 1974 - L'Océan Indien au XVIIIe, éd. Flammarion, Paris.  
 1971 - Histoire de l'île Maurice, éd. PUF
 1967 - La Route des îles : Contribution à l'histoire maritime des Mascareignes, éd. S.E.V.P.E.N. 
 1966 - Une Cité tropicale, Port-Louis de l'Ile Maurice, éd. PUF Vendôme

In English
 1954 - Bibliography of Mauritius (1502-1954) avec H. Adolphe, Esclapon Limited, Port Louis

References

Mauritian historians
Archivists
1911 births
1987 deaths
Historians of Africa
20th-century historians